Doxa Gikanji (born 21 August 1990) is a Congolese professional footballer who plays as a midfielder.

International career

International goals
Scores and results list DR Congo's goal tally first.

References

External links 
 

1990 births
Living people
Democratic Republic of the Congo footballers
Democratic Republic of the Congo international footballers
Association football midfielders
21st-century Democratic Republic of the Congo people
2016 African Nations Championship players
Democratic Republic of the Congo A' international footballers
2020 African Nations Championship players